Saints and Sinners is a short story collection by Edna O'Brien. Faber and Faber published it in 2011.

The collection includes the O'Brien story "Sinners" in which a lonely widow running an isolated rural bed and breakfast overhears the sexual antics of a man, woman and teenage girl who on arrival claim to be couple and daughter - "Then came the exclamations, the three pitches of sound so different -- the woman's loud and gloating, the girl's, helpless, as if she were almost crying, and the man, like a jackass down the woods with his lady loves."

Saints and Sinners won the 2011 Frank O'Connor International Short Story Award.

References

External links
 Saints and Sinners, By Edna O'Brien, Arifa Akbar, 11 February 2011
 Saints and Sinners by Edna O'Brien – review, Sylvia Brownrigg, The Guardian, 5 March 2011
 A Night for Saints and Sinners: An evening with Edna O'Brien at NYU's Glucksman Ireland House, Kathleen Rockwell Lawrence, Irish America magazine, 14 July 2011

2011 short story collections
Irish short story collections
Works by Edna O'Brien
Faber and Faber books